Scott Glasgow is a Hollywood-based musical composer. He has a Bachelor of Music from California State University, Northridge and a Master of Music from the San Francisco Conservatory of Music in 2001 where he was a student of Conrad Susa. He studied with John Corigliano at the Aspen Music Festival 2002 and was in the ASACP Film Scoring program in 2004. Since 2005 has made his career as a film composer with over 20+ studio features to date. He also teaches at the university level, with classes in film scoring at CSUN California State University, Northridge and UCLA University of California, Los Angeles. He has contributed addition music to films, TV and games including video games DC Universe Online, TV shows HBO Curb Your Enthusiasm and CBS 60 Minutes and feature films Captain America: Civil War.

Filmography
 They (2002) – assistant composer
 The 5 Coolest Things (2003) – composer
 Wrong Turn (2003) – assistant composer
 Runaway Jury (2003) – score technical assistant
 An Unfinished Life (2005) – score coordinator
 Spider-Man 2 (2004) – score preparation
 The Grudge (2004) – score coordinator (uncredited)
 Dark Kingdom: The Dragon King (2004) – orchestrator
 Nine Lives (2005) – score preparation
 Build or Bust (2005) – additional music
 The Skeleton Key (2005) – score preparation
 Chasing Ghosts (2005) – composer
 Robotech: The Shadow Chronicles (2006) – composer
 Hack! (2006) – composer
 Toxic (2007) – composer
 Bone Dry (2007) – composer
 The Gene Generation (2008) – composer
 Lo (2008) – composer
 The Bridge to Nowhere (2009) – composer
 Taking Chances (2009) – composer
 Hollywood & Wine (2010) – composer
 National Lampoon's 301: The Legend of Awesomest Maximus (2010) – composer
 Riddle (2013) – composer
 Hatchet III (2013) – composer
 The Wedding Pact (2013) – composer
 Secrets of a Psychopath (2014) – composer
 Poker Night (2014) – composer
 The Curse of Sleeping Beauty (2015) – composer **HMMA Award Winner**
 Captain America: Civil War (2016) – composer (additional music)
 Ghosthunters (2016) – composer
 Stasis (2017) – composer
 Slay Belles (2018) – composer
 The Ninth Passenger (2018) – composer
 Trauma Therapy (2019) – composer
 Slayer: The Repentless Killogy (2019) – composer
 Attack Of The Unknown (2020) – composer
 Breach (2020) – composer
 Cosmic Sin (2021) – composer
 Manipulated (2021) – composer
 Bloodthirst (2022) – composer
 Deathcount (2022) – composer
 The Wedding Pact 2: The Baby Pact (2022) – composer
 The Night Of The Tommyknockers (2022) – composer

Discography
 Chasing Ghosts (2005) – Movie Score Media
 Robotech: The Shadow Chronicles (2006) – Varèse Sarabande
 Hack! (2006) – Movie Score Media
 Bone Dry (2008) – Intrada Records
 Toxic (2009) – Movie Score Media The Gene Generation (2009) – Varèse Sarabande
 Lo (2010) – Movie Score Media
 Riddle (2013) – Varèse Sarabande
 Secrets of a Psychopath (2015) – Movie Score Media
 Hatchet III (2015) – Intrada Records
 Poker Night (2015) – Movie Score Media
 Totem EP (2017) – Fourteen Kings Music
 Stasis (2017) – Fourteen Kings Music
 Slay Belles (2018) – Fourteen Kings Music
 The Ninth Passenger (2018) – Fourteen Kings Music
 Trauma Therapy (2019) – Fourteen Kings Music
 Breach (2020) – Fourteen Kings Music
 Attack Of The Unknown (2020) – Fourteen Kings Music
 Cosmic Sin (2021) – The Orchard
 Manipulated'' (2021) – Fourteen Kings Music

List of Compositions (Concert Music)
 "Mass" for Mixed Choir (a cappella)
 "Betelgeuse" for Solo Amplified Cello with digital effects
 "Gothic Fragments" for mixed instruments
 "Piano Trio 'Earthquake'" for Piano Trio (inspired by the 1994 Northridge, California Earthquake)
 "Three" (slow movement from Piano Trio, simplified for children's level playing).
 "Silver Sound" for Two Percussionists
 "Hyper-Reality" for Orchestra
 "Temporal Fuges" for String Quartet
 "Wind Quintet ' Winter Music'" for Woodwind Quartet
 "Tenebrae" for String Orchestra
 "Petrarch Songs" for Mezzo-Soprano and Piano (based on text of Petrarch).
 "The Prince Of Venosa" (an Opera In Two Acts with a Prologue and Epilogue – based on the life of Don Carlo Gesualdo).
 "Sappho Songs" for Medium Voice and Piano (based on text of Sappho).
 "Dreams Of Poe" for Choir and Orchestra (based on the dream poetry of Edgar Allan Poe). (2005) Three Movements : 1. A Dream 2. Dream 3. Dreams

Other works
"The Turning Wheel" for Solo Guitar (1987)
"Serenade" for Solo Guitar (Wedding Celebration) (1998)

External links
 
 Scott Glasgow's homepage
 Scott Glasgow's MySpace Music page
 Interview with Scott Glasgow (The Daily Film Music Blog)

21st-century American composers
21st-century American male musicians
American male composers
California State University, Northridge alumni
Living people
Robotech cast and crew
Year of birth missing (living people)